Major General Sir Noel Galway Holmes KBE CB MC (25 December 1891 – 24 December 1982) was a senior British Army officer during the Second World War and Davis Cup tennis player for Ireland.

Biography
Born in Galway, Ireland, on 25 December 1891, Noel Holmes attended and was educated at Bedford School. He joined the Royal Irish Regiment in 1912 and served in India between 1912 and 1914. During the First World War he served in France. He served in Upper Silesia between 1921 and 1922. In 1922 he joined the East Yorkshire Regiment and, after attending the Staff College, Camberley from 1926 to 1927, served in India between 1933 and 1937.

During the Second World War he was Director of Movements at the War Office, between 1939 and 1943. He attended the conferences of allied war leaders in Casablanca, Washington, D.C., Quebec City, Cairo, Tehran, Yalta and Potsdam. He was Deputy Quartermaster General at the War Office between 1943 and 1946 and, briefly, General Officer Commanding Aldershot Command from September 1946 to November 1946.

Major General Sir Noel Holmes was invested as a Companion of the Order of the British Empire in 1940, as a Companion of the Order of the Bath in 1943, and as a Knight Commander of the Order of the British Empire in 1946. He married Mary Clifford, daughter of Sir Hugh Clifford, on 19 June 1920 and they had two children.  He retired from the British Army in 1946 and died on 24 December 1982.

References

External links
Generals of World War II

 

1891 births
1982 deaths
Military personnel from County Galway
Irish officers in the British Army
People educated at Bedford School
British Army personnel of World War I
British Army generals of World War II
Recipients of the Military Cross
Companions of the Order of the Bath
Knights Commander of the Order of the British Empire
Royal Irish Regiment (1684–1922) officers
East Yorkshire Regiment officers
Graduates of the Staff College, Camberley
People from Galway (city)
British Army major generals
War Office personnel in World War II
Irish male tennis players